Eccles Sixth Form College is a further education college in Eccles, Greater Manchester, England. It was opened in 1972.

The site provides a range of Vocational courses, across a variety of specialisms. Students are also able to retake their GCSEs at the college. Eccles Sixth Form College has an average pass rate that is above the national average.

Merger
The merger of Eccles College, Salford College and Pendleton College took place on 1 January 2009, forming the new Salford City College Group.

References

External links
Official site

Education in Salford
Educational institutions established in 1972
Educational institutions disestablished in 2008
1972 establishments in England
Eccles, Greater Manchester